
Year 543 (DXLIII) was a common year starting on Thursday (link will display the full calendar) of the Julian calendar. The denomination 543 for this year has been used since the early medieval period, when the Anno Domini calendar era became the prevalent method in Europe for naming years.

Events 
 By place 

 Europe 
 Spring – Siege of Naples (542–543): The Byzantine garrison (1,000 men) in Naples surrenders to the Ostrogoths, pressed by famine and demoralized by the failure of two relief efforts. The defenders are well treated by King Totila, and the garrison is allowed safe departure, but the city walls are partly razed.

 Africa 
 The fortress city of Old Dongola (modern Sudan) along the River Nile becomes the capital of the Kingdom of Makuria. Several churches are built, including the "Old Church" (approximate date).

 Persia 
 Summer – Khosrow I, Shahanshah of the Sasanian Empire, invades Syria again, and turns south towards Edessa to besiege the fortress city. 
 The Hephthalites threaten the Sasanian Empire from the East. They extend their domain in Central Asia (approximate date).
 A Byzantine invasion of Persarmenia is defeated at the Battle of Anglon by a much smaller force from the Sasanian Empire.

 Asia 
 King Pulakeshin I establishes the Chalukya dynasty in India. He extends his kingdom by conquering Vakataka and the west coast of Karnataka, giving him access to the valuable Arabian Sea trade routes.

 By topic 

 Learning 
 Approximate date – The Yupian (玉篇) Chinese dictionary is edited by Gu Yewang.

 Religion 
 The doctrine of apocatastasis is condemned by the Synod of Constantinople.

Births 
 Brunhilda, queen of Austrasia (approximate date)
 Columbanus, Irish missionary (d. 615)
 Jing Di, emperor of the Liang Dynasty (d. 558)
 Wu Di, emperor of Northern Zhou (d. 578)

Deaths 
 Octa, king of Kent (approximate date) (b. 500)
 Adolius, Byzantine officer

References